Warrick Brown (born 1971) is a fictional character in the CBS crime drama CSI: Crime Scene Investigation, portrayed by Gary Dourdan. Warrick appeared in all but five episodes until his death in the first episode of season nine, with the exceptions of "Caged" from season two, "After the Show" from season four, "Crow's Feet" and "Committed" from season five, and "The Chick Chop Flick Shop" from season eight.

Early life and childhood 
Brown is a Las Vegas native, whose father abandoned him soon after his birth and whose mother died when he was seven years old. Raised by his grandmother and Aunt Bertha, Warrick found it very difficult to socialize and could often be found with his head in a book. His love of mathematics and science took him to Western Las Vegas University, where he earned a Bachelor of Science in Chemistry.

Background and personality 
Warrick grew up in a strict household and kept his position as a casino runner a secret from his grandmother. He once told Catherine that while he was unpopular in high school he had "got a little action". He was strongly influenced by a community organizer who ran a center where he spent time after school.

Early in the series it was discovered that Warrick had a gambling addiction. He even admitted to Sara Sidle that he counted cards. After an incident in the pilot episode that resulted in a rookie's death, Warrick's gambling addiction caused friction with a number of other team members. Sara did not get along with Warrick early in the series because she knew of his addiction; however, they ended up becoming good friends and colleagues. Warrick was also something of a mentor and older brother to Greg Sanders. He did chastise Sanders when the latter, still a very green trainee at the time, showed up late to a crime scene, dressed as if he just woken up, and not having restocked or sterilized his kit, prior to showing the young Sanders how Brown's own vehicle was properly stocked and well-organized.

Warrick was also sensitive to the difficulties of minorities. When Jason, an African-American teenager he was mentoring was arrested, Warrick paid his bail.  Also, Warrick showed understanding and sympathy for the young African American James Moore, who committed a hit and run that resulted in the death of a young girl. He offered advice before James was taken into custody and gave him his cell phone number. He told James to contact him just in case trouble arises in prison.

Family 
After dating a woman named Tina for a short time, Warrick proposed and married her in Season 6. Nearing the Season 6 finale, Warrick's marriage seemed to have become rocky, especially when he discovered that she was cheating on him. Through the midpoint of Season 7, Warrick still wore his wedding band, which could suggest that he and Tina had worked through their differences. In season 8, however, Warrick told Catherine that he was getting divorced.

Later on in the season, Warrick found out that Tina was pregnant with his child. He asked her to let him raise the child with her, only to be met by resistance from Tina. At Warrick's funeral, Sara and Greg discovered that Warrick had a son named Eli with Tina, and had been fighting for custody over him. Tina also brought their son to the funeral.

Relationships

Catherine Willows 
Warrick appeared to have a close working and personal relationship with Catherine Willows, although it became clear throughout the show that their relationship did not develop into a romantic one. In the season 5 episode "Down the Drain", he and Catherine shared a "romantic" moment which was interrupted. Catherine and Warrick continued to flirt with each other until Season 6, when Warrick proposed to his girlfriend, Tina. Catherine told Warrick that she was disappointed that he hadn't told her, and was visibly upset and jealous of his new relationship.

Nick Stokes 
Warrick and co-worker Nick Stokes were close friends and surrogate brothers. Warrick was frightened when Nick was kidnapped and buried alive, and led the team in rescuing him. Nick was very upset when Warrick was murdered, and was tempted to kill his murderer in cold blood; he relented and let the killer live, however, reasoning that Warrick would not have wanted him to throw his life away.

Gil Grissom 
Warrick had a deep, abiding respect for Gil Grissom. Grissom genuinely cared for Warrick as well; he regarded Warrick as like a son, often trying to help the younger man when he struggled with his gambling addiction. He later said that he thought Warrick could potentially have been his successor as lab supervisor. Grissom was the first person to find Warrick after he was shot, and held him in his arms as he died. Later in the episode, "For Warrick", the team found a video in Warrick's home in which he stated that he never knew his biological father, but if he had to choose someone to be his father, it would have been Grissom.

Greg Sanders 
Warrick was something of an older brother to Greg Sanders. When Sanders expressed an interest in transitioning out into the field, Warrick took him under his wing. In the episode "Early Rollout", when Sanders came to the scene clearly unprepared, arriving in disheveled street clothes and a trunk in almost complete disarray, Warrick chastised him for that, noting that he would've gotten much worse had it been from Grissom. Warrick then proceeded to show Greg how a properly stocked trunk should look, complete with a properly stocked & sterilized kit, a backup kit, divider full of forms, and everything else he could possibly need to process a scene, right down to what he wanted to eat and how he wanted his food prepared.

Death 
In the Season 8 finale, "For Gedda", Warrick was held for questioning after the murder of mafia boss Lou Gedda. Earlier in the season, Warrick had become involved with a woman connected with Gedda. After she was killed, Warrick became a prime suspect in her murder. During the investigation, rumors spread that Gedda had a mole in the LVPD. Gedda called Warrick to inform him that he was "ready to talk". When Gedda was murdered, Warrick was framed for his death. Grissom's team discovered that another LVPD officer was involved in Gedda's murder and the LVPD did not press charges against Warrick. After Warrick's release, he and the rest of Grissom's team ate at a local diner to celebrate his acquittal. As Warrick left the restaurant and headed to his car, Undersheriff Jeffrey McKeen – the mole in the LVPD – shot him twice, mortally wounding him.

In the Season 9 premiere, "For Warrick", Grissom found Warrick bleeding to death in his car; Warrick tried to tell Grissom that McKeen shot him, but was deterred by McKeen's brandishing of his sidearm, and died in Grissom's arms. McKeen was eventually found out and arrested for his murder. Warrick's funeral was held a few days later and Grissom delivered an emotional eulogy, saying that he would miss him "so much". To honor Warrick's memory, the CSI team started a college fund for his son Eli.

In the CSI: Miami season eight episode "Bone Voyage", when Lt. Horatio Caine meets Raymond Langston for the first time, he asked Langston if he could tell Catherine that, "I'm very sorry about Warrick Brown".

References 

Black people in television
CSI: Crime Scene Investigation characters
Fictional African-American people
Fictional chemists
Fictional forensic scientists
Fictional gamblers
Fictional Las Vegas Police Department detectives
Fictional musicians
Orphan characters in television
Television characters introduced in 2000